Quercus tinkhamii is a species of oak endemic to the Sierra Madre Oriental of eastern Mexico.

Description
Quercus tinkhamii is a shrubby oak.

Range and habitat
Quercus tinkhamii is native to the central Sierra Madre Oriental and some sky island ranges on the Mexican Plateau, in the states of Chihuahua, Hidalgo, Nuevo León, San Luis Potosí, and Tamaulipas.

Quercus tinkhamii grows in oak-pine forest and xerophilic scrubland above 1,400 meters elevation.

References

tinkhamii
Endemic oaks of Mexico
Flora of the Sierra Madre Oriental
Plants described in 1942
Flora of the Mexican Plateau